Chingari is a 1940 social Hindi film directed by Sarvottam Badami. Made under the banner of  Sudama Productions, the film had music by Gyan Dutt. Prithviraj Kapoor shifted from New Theatres Ltd. Calcutta to Bombay, where he worked under Badami in two films, Sajani and Chingari both made in 1940. The cast included Prithviraj Kapoor, Sabita Devi, E. Billimoria, Meera, Khatoon and Keshavrao Date.

The story was about a married woman who has been turned out of her husband's house by her in-laws citing her mother's supposedly bad reputation. She goes to live with her brother, who is financially not in a state to support her. The later scenes focus on attempts at reconciliation by her husband.

Plot
Geeta, lives with her brother, who is financially too poor to support her. She is married, but leads a lonely life, as her father-in-law turns her out of the family house stating that her mother had a bad name in society. Her husband, Biren, now wants a reconciliation. The father-in-law is dead, as also is Biren's other wife through whom he has a son, Charan. Geeta initially is angrily opposed to any patch up but Charan's subsequent illness brings the couple together.

Cast
 Prithviraj Kapoor
 Sabita Devi
 E. Billimoria
 Meera 
 Khatoon
 Sunalini Devi
 Keshavrao Date
 Bhagwandas

Review
According to Baburao Patel, in his review of the film in the June 1940 issue of Filmindia, the "lack of sufficient and correct publicity" was the reason for the film not being a commercial success at the box-office. He positively commended the director calling Badami a "'Chhota' Barua" (small Barua) as he felt Badami had "emulated" the director from Bengal in the manner the film was directed "A very nicely directed picture". Sabita was also praised for her performance as Gita, "which for its sheer sincerity is outstanding". However, he advised her to refrain from singing her own songs as her "bad singing, always unnecessary, lessens the intrinsic merit of her otherwise excellent performance". E Billimoria, "this old timer gave a good seasoned performance", and Prithviraj Kapoor were also lauded for their acting.

Music
The music was composed by Gyan Dutt with lyrics written by J. S. Kashyap, Pyare Lal Santoshi. The singers were Durgesh Kumari, Amritlal Nagar, Patgaonkar, Sabita Devi and Khatoon.

Song List

References

External links

1940 films
1940s Hindi-language films
Films scored by Gyan Dutt
Indian black-and-white films
Films directed by Sarvottam Badami